The 2007–08 Essex Senior Football League season was the 37th in the history of Essex Senior Football League a football competition in England.

League table

The league featured 15 clubs which competed in the league last season, along with two new clubs:
Enfield 1893, new club formed after Enfield folded
Mauritius Sports & Pennant, promoted from the Middlesex County League

League table

References

Essex Senior Football League seasons
9